Dorinda is a feminine given name, related to Dora, and its variants. It may refer to:

People
Dorinda Keenan Borer (born 1963), American businessperson and politician
Dorinda Clark-Cole (born 1957), American evangelist and gospel singer, member of The Clark Sisters
Dorinda Hafner, Ghanaian-born Australian storyteller, actress, dancer, choreographer, public speaker, writer and television chef
Dorinda Morgan, a music producer - see Becoming the Beach Boys: The Complete Hite & Dorinda Morgan Sessions
Dorinda Neligan (1833–1914), Irish-born English headmistress and suffragette
Dori Sanders (born 1934), African-American novelist and food writer
Dorinda Medley (born 1964), American television personality - see The Real Housewives of New York City

Fictional characters
Dorinda, a major character in Handel's 1733 opera seria Orlando
Dorinda, a major character in the 1707 play The Beaux' Stratagem
Dorinda, in Dryden's 1667 comedy The Tempest
Dorinda, a nymph in the 1590 play Il pastor fido
Dorinda Durston, the love interest in the 1943 film A Guy Named Joe and the 1989 remake Always
Dorinda Rogers, one of the main characters in The Cheetah Girls (novel series)

See also
Porphyrosela dorinda, a species of moth
Darinda, a Pakistani Urdu film released in 2002
Derinda Township, Jo Daviess County, Illinois
Maťo Ďurinda (born 1961), member of the Slovak hard rock/heavy metal band Tublatanka

References

Feminine given names